Of the many unconformities (gaps) observed in geological strata, the term Great Unconformity is frequently applied to either the unconformity observed by James Hutton in 1787 at Siccar Point in Scotland, or that observed by John Wesley Powell in the Grand Canyon in 1869. Both instances are exceptional examples of where the contacts between sedimentary strata and either sedimentary or crystalline strata of greatly different ages, origins, and structure represent periods of geologic time sufficiently long to raise great mountains and then erode them away.

Background
Unconformities tend to reflect long-term changes in the pattern of the accumulation of sedimentary or igneous strata in low-lying areas (often ocean basins, such as the Gulf of Mexico or the North Sea, but also Bangladesh and much of Brazil), then being uplifted and eroded (such as the ongoing Himalayan orogeny, the older Laramide orogeny of the Rocky Mountains, or much older Appalachian (Alleghanian) and Ouachita orogenies), then subsequently subsiding, eventually to be buried under younger sediments. The intervening periods of tectonic uplift are generally periods of mountain building, often due to the collision of tectonic plates. The "great" unconformities of regional or continental scale (in both geography and chronology) are associated with either global changes in eustatic sea level or the supercontinent cycle, the periodic merger of all the continents into one approximately every 500 million years.

Hutton's Unconformity
Hutton's Unconformity at Siccar Point, in county of Berwickshire on the east coast of Scotland, is an angular unconformity that consists of gently dipping, reddish, Upper Devonian and Lower Carboniferous breccias, sandstones, and conglomerates of the Old Red Sandstone overlying deeply eroded, near-vertical, greyish, Silurian (Llandovery) greywackes and shales. The Llandovery greywackes and graptolite-bearing shales of the Gala Group were deposited by turbidity currents in a deep sea environment about 425 million years ago. The overlying Devonian strata were deposited by rivers and streams about 345 million years ago. Thus, this unconformity reflects a gap of about 80 million years during which deep sea sediments were lithified, folded, and uplifted; later deeply eroded and weathered subaerially; and finally buried by river and stream sediments.

Exposures of the unconformity at Siccar Point, provided James Hutton, accompanied by John Playfair and Sir James Hall, the clearest example of an unconformable relationship between two sets of sedimentary strata that involved a complex geological history. The clear truncation of near-vertical Silurian sedimentary strata by well-bedded conglomerates and sandstones belonging to the Upper Old Red Sandstone allowed Hutton to demonstrate the existence of significant breaks in the geological record, in this case a break separating strata that were then called alpine schistus and secondary strata. This and other unconformities provided evidence for Hutton's ideas about the recycling of geological materials and for unconformities representing very large time periods. He argued that these concepts pointed to the great antiquity of the Earth and the vastness of the geological time-scale.

Powell’s Unconformity, Grand Canyon

The Great Unconformity of Powell in the Grand Canyon is a regional unconformity that separates the Tonto Group from the underlying, faulted and tilted sedimentary rocks of the Grand Canyon Supergroup and vertically foliated metamorphic and igneous rocks of the Vishnu Basement Rocks. The unconformity between the Tonto Group and the Vishnu Basement Rocks is a nonconformity. The break between the Tonto Group and the Grand Canyon Supergroup is an angular unconformity.

Powell's Great Unconformity is part of a continent-wide unconformity that extends across Laurentia, the ancient core of North America. It was first recognized twelve years before Powell's expedition by John Newberry in New Mexico, during the Ives expedition of 1857–1858. However, the disruption of the American Civil War kept Newberry's work from becoming widely known. This Great Unconformity marks the progressive submergence of this landmass by a shallow cratonic sea and its burial by shallow marine sediments of the Cambrian-Early Ordovician Sauk sequence. The submergence of Laurentia ended a lengthy period of widespread continental denudation that exhumed and deeply eroded Precambrian rocks and exposed them to extensive physical and chemical weathering at the Earth's surface. As a result, Powell's Great Unconformity is unusual in its geographic extent and its stratigraphic significance.

The length of time represented by Powell's Great Unconformity varies along its length. Within the Grand Canyon, the Great Unconformity represents a period of about 175 million years between the Tonto Group and the youngest subdivision, the Sixtymile Formation, of the Grand Canyon Supergroup. At the base of the Grand Canyon Supergroup, where it truncates the Bass Formation, the period of time represented by this angular unconformity increases to about 725 million years. Where the Tonto Group overlies the Vishnu Basement Rocks, the Great Unconformity represents a period as much as 1.2 to 1.6 billion years. (See also geological timescale.)

Frenchman Mountain, Nevada
A prominent exposure of Powell's Great Unconformity occurs in Frenchman Mountain in Nevada. Frenchman Mountain exposes a sequence of Phanerozoic strata equivalent to those found in the Grand Canyon. At the base of this sequence, the Great Unconformity, with the Tapeats Sandstone of the Tonto Group overlying the Vishnu Basement Rocks, is well exposed in a manner that is atypical and scientifically significant in its combination of extent and accessibility. This exposure is frequently illustrated in popular and educational publications, and is often part of geological fieldtrips. There is a gap of about 1.2 billion years where 550 million year old strata of the Tapeats Sandstone rests on 1.7 billion (1700 million) year old Vishnu Basement Rocks.

As a widespread phenomenon
The term "Great Unconformity" has also been used to refer to the anomalous concentration of unconformities, including basement nonconformities, below the base of the Cambrian. Charles Walcott was among the first to note this phenomenon, remarking in 1910:

A potential link has been proposed between such sub-Cambrian unconformities and glacial erosion during the Neoproterozoic Snowball Earth glaciations. Alternatively, it has been proposed that multiple smaller events, such as the formation and breakup of Rodinia, created many unconformities worldwide. Evidence indicates that the Pikes Peak unconformity was formed before the Snowball Earth glaciations.

Possible causes of the Great Unconformity 
There is currently no widely accepted explanation for the Great Unconformity among geoscientists. There are theories that have been proposed; it is widely accepted that there was a combination of more than one event which may have caused such an extensive phenomenon. One example is a large glaciation event which took place during the Neoproterozoic, starting around 720 million years ago. This is also when a significant glaciation event known as 'Snowball Earth' occurred. Snowball Earth covered almost the entire planet with ice. The areas that underwent glaciation were approximately those where the Great Unconformity is located today. When glaciers move, they drag and erode sediment away from the underlying rock. This would explain how a large section of rock was taken away from widespread areas around the same time.

See also
 Geology of the Grand Canyon area (with time scale)
 List of orogenies
 Orogeny (mountain building)

References

External links
 Hutton's Unconformity
 Anonymous (2003) Siccar Point Field Excursion Preview. School of GeoSciences, University of Edinburgh, Edinburgh, Scotland. last accessed September 22, 2013.
 Moore, R (2009) Siccar Point. Reports of the National Center for Science Education. 29(1):26. last accessed September 22, 2013.
 Rowan, C (2011) The making of an angular unconformity: Hutton’s unconformity at Siccar Point. Highly Allochthonous. last accessed September 22, 2013.

 Powell's Unconformity
 
 Abbott, W (2001) Revisiting the Grand Canyon – Through the Eyes of Seismic Sequence Stratigraphy. AAPG Datapages / Search and Discovery, American Association of Petroleum Geologist, Tulsa, Oklahoma. last accessed September 22, 2013.
 Brandriss, M. (2004) Angular unconformity between Proterozoic and Cambrian rocks, Grand Canyon, Arizona. GeoDIL, A Geoscience Digital Image Library, University of North Dakota, Grand Forks, North Dakota. last accessed September 22, 2013.
 Share, J. (2102a) The Great Unconformity of the Grand Canyon and the Late Proterozoic-Cambrian Time Interval: Part I – Defining It. last accessed September 22, 2013.
 Share, J. (2102a) The Great Unconformity and the Late Proterozoic-Cambrian Time Interval: Part II – The Rifting of Rodinia and the "Snowball Earth" Glaciations That Followed. last accessed September 22, 2013.

 The Unconformity in Wyoming

Rock formations of Arizona
Rock formations of Nevada
Rock formations of Scotland
Geology of Arizona
Geology of Nevada
Geology of Scotland
Unconformities